The London Chronicle was an early family newspaper of Georgian London. It was a thrice-a-week evening paper, introduced in 1756, and contained world and national news, and coverage of artistic, literary, and theatrical events in the capital.

A typical issue was eight pages, quarto size. Many of the stories were copied from government reports published in the official London Gazette. Copying from other newspapers was rife, and many reports were in the form of letters from so-called gentlemen.

Originally titled The London Chronicle: or, Universal Evening Post it first ran from 1757 to June 1765. It was continued by The London Chronicle which appeared in 113 volumes from 2 July 1765 to 23 April 1823. It was then absorbed by the Commercial chronicle and continued in its original title (London chronicle: or, Universal evening post). In 1823 it was absorbed into the London Packet.

This newspaper was one of the first to break the news that the United States had declared independence from the British Empire, reporting on the event in its 13 August, 1776 edition. It was also one of the first to publish the declaration in its entirety, in the 15–17 August 1776 edition, but containing no explanation or comment as to what it was.

References

Archives
 Vol. 1. January 1-June 30, 1757
 Vol. 2. June 30-December 31, 1757
 Vol. 4. June 30 - December 31, 1758
 Vol. 5. January 1-June 30, 1759
 Vol. 6. July 1 - December 31, 1759.
 Vol. 8. July 1 - December 31, 1760
 Vol. 9. January 1-June 30, 1761
 Vol 10. July 1 - December 31, 1761
 Vol. 11. January 1-June 30, 1762
 Vol. 12. June 30-December 31, 1762
 Vol. 13. January 1-June 30, 1763
 Vol. 14. July 1-December 31, 1763
 Vol. 33. December 31, 1772-June 29, 1773 
 Vol. 71. January 2-December 29, 1792
 Vol. 82. June 29 - December 30, 1797
 Vol. 85. December 29, 1798-June 29, 1799
 Vol. 87. December 31, 1799 - June 28, 1800
 Vol. 105. January 1-June 30, 1809
 Vol. 106. July 1 - December 31, 1809
 Vol. 107. January 1 - June 30, 1810
 Vol. 108. July 1-December 31, 1810
 Vol. 109. January 1-June 30, 1811 
 Vol. 110. July 1 - December 31, 1811
 Vol. 111. January 1 - June 30, 1812
 Vol. 112. July 1-December 31, 1812
 Vol. 113. January 1-June 30, 1813
 Vol. 114 June 30, 1813-January 1, 1814

Defunct newspapers published in the United Kingdom
Publications established in 1757
Publications disestablished in 1823
1757 establishments in England
1823 disestablishments in England
London newspapers